Pattas is a 2020 Indian Tamil-language martial arts film written and directed by R. S. Durai Senthilkumar and produced by Sathya Jyothi Films. It stars Dhanush in dual role with Sneha, Mehreen Pirzada, and Naveen Chandra while Nassar, Munishkanth, and Manobala play supporting roles. The film has music composed by Vivek-Mervin. It marks the second collaboration between Dhanush and director Durai Senthilkumar after Kodi. The film depicts Adimurai, an ancient martial art that was practiced in Tamil Nadu. For their roles, Dhanush and Sneha underwent martial arts training prior to the commencement of the filming.

The film was released theatrically on 15 January 2020 coinciding Thai Pongal. The film received mixed to positive reviews and became an box office success.

Plot 
The film begins with Kanyakumari and her son Shakthi being ambushed by some foreigners. When one of the foreigners beats her son, Kanya gets enraged and plucks out the foreigner's larynx, which is noticed by the police nearby. Kanya is arrested and sent to jail for 16 years.

We are taken to the present, where Shakthi and Puncture are robbing an MMA academy. The owner of the academy, Nilan, gets upset when he finds out that his trophy is missing and calls the police in to investigate. The police, in turn, call Shakthi and Puncture, only for the two to become informers for the police and find out the robbers who robbed Nilan's trophy (the police officers do not know that it was Shakthi and Puncture who robbed the trophy). They are forced to work with Sadhana Sha, the owner of their opposite house and with whom they have an enmity. Later in the film, it is revealed that Shakthi and Puncture robbed the academy, knowing the fact that Sadhana was kept in charge of it, hence humiliating her. Meanwhile, Kanya is released from jail and follows Nilan, planning to kill him. She follows him until his gym, where she sees Shakthi, who she thought, got killed when the foreigner hit him. Nilan finds out that she is attempting to kill him and tries to capture her but in vain. When Kanya comes to Shakthi's house in searching for him, Sadhana, unbeknownst to her, sets up Kanya and leaves her to get attacked because Nilan, her boss, instructed her to do so. When thugs arrive at Kanya's location to kill her, Shakthi comes to her rescue and, in the process, finds out that she is his mother. He then finds out his past.

Dhiraviyaperumal is a skilled Adimurai warrior and Shakthi's father, who is taught the art by his master Muthaiah Asaan, who is also Nilan's (actual name Nilapparai) father. Nilan's father, who himself is a skilled Adimurai warrior, keeps degrading him because Nilan is not able to learn Adimurai, which leaves Nilan frustrated. Even though Dhiraviyaperumal and Nilan are friends, on hearing his father continuously compares Dhiraviyaperumal's feats with his own, Nilan gets agitated. When Nilan is forced to fight Kanya, who also stays in the village, and she defeats him, he is very humiliated, and he leaves the village.

Dhiraviyaperumal soon realizes that Adimurai is only known to their village and is not known to Tamil Nadu when his disciple commits suicide when he is refused the job of a police officer. He decides to open a school that teaches Adimurai and gets the minister to agree. Meanwhile, Nilan comes back from abroad as a kickboxing champion and plans to recruit people to learn kickboxing. On confronting the villagers, he beats a boy, which leads to a fight between Nilan and Dhiraviyaperumal; if Nilan wins, he can teach kickboxing, and if Dhiraviyaperumal wins, Nilan has to fall at the feet of the boy he hit and ask for forgiveness. Dhiraviyaperumal defeats Nilan, and in retaliation, Nilan kills Muthaiah Asaan and poisons the food of the village. He then burns down the village and Dhiraviyaperumal to death. Kanya escapes with her son Shakthi, leading to the events in the beginning.

Shakthi swears revenge and enrolls in the MMA event organized by Nilan. He is trained by his mother, Kanya, in the art of Adimurai. On the day of the event, Nilan uses a convict from Thailand who has killed four people in the ring to fight with Shakthi. Shakthi defeats him, but the convict stabs Shakthi in the right shoulder. He still fights the next opponent and emerges victorious as he is ambidextrous. Nilan asks his son Richard to use unethical methods, to kill Shakthi, but Richard refuses and forfeits the match. Sadhana eavesdrops on Nilan and tells Shakthi, but ends up getting smashed into a glass table. Due to this, she is rushed to the hospital. Nilan then challenges Shakthi, and while Nilan has the upper hand initially, Shakthi defeats Nilan and lets Nilan go, like his father. The film ends with Shakthi winning the championship and giving a speech on Adimurai and its importance, followed by the acceptance of Adimurai as a sport by the Tamil Nadu Sports ministry, thus achieving Dhiraviyaperumal's dream of spreading Adimurai throughout Tamil Nadu.

Cast

Production 
For this film, Prakash Mabbu and G. Durairaj were selected as editor and art director respectively after previously collaborated with director Durai Senthilkumar for Kodi. Meanwhile, Om Prakash was assigned as the film's cinematographer and this was his fourth outing with Dhanush after Maari, Anegan and Maari 2. Just like Kodi, the director-actor combination's earlier venture, Pattas too has Dhanush playing dual roles. The stunts were choreographed by Dhilip Subbarayan.

Pattas features Dhanush in dual roles – father and son. The portion featuring Dhanush as the father has actress Sneha as his partner, and Mehreen Pirzada has been signed as Dhanush's partner for the son's role. The film's first look poster was released on 28 July 2019, coinciding with actor Dhanush's birthday. For their roles, Dhanush and Sneha underwent martial arts training prior to the commencement of the filming.

Music 

The music for this film will be composed by Vivek-Mervin, collaborating with director Senthilkumar and actor Dhanush for the first time, and the lyrics were written by Vivek and Dhanush. The audio rights were purchased by Lahari Music.

The album features seven tracks, which three of them were being released as singles, and the first single track titled "Chill Bro", which was sung by Dhanush, released on 1 December 2019, went viral on YouTube with its lyric video crossing 3 million views. The tracklist was released on 9 January 2020 and the full album was released two days later at the Suryan FM Radio Station in Chennai.

Moviecrow rated the album 3.25 out of 5 and summarised it as "Vivek Mervin produces easily accessible energetic tracks for Pattas and barring few misses, composer duo deliver a fine commercial album after a long time." Studio Flicks rated the album 3 out of 5, stating,  "Pattas is an album that easily indicates the movie is an out and out commercial entertainer and having used this term, it is sure that the songs will achieve an escalated stature with the visuals. For now, Chill Bro and Jigidi Killadi happen to be the instant attractions" and gave a verdict "Vivek-Mervin offer a tailor-made package that a commercial entertainer demands."

Release 
The film was released on 15 January 2020, coinciding with the Pongal festival.

Reception 
The film received mixed to positive reviews from critics and audience. IndiaGlitz rated 2.5 out of 5 stars stating "Dhanush is the saviour of this mass entertainer."The Times of India rated 2.5 out of 5 stars stating "A formulaic action drama that is predictable from start to finish". Behindwoods rated 2.75 out of 5 stars stating "Pattas is a well made commercial entertainer with good performances that highlights our ancient martial arts."Sify rated 3 out of 5 stars stating "A commercial entertainer for Pongal family audiences. Go in with modest expectations and you may not be disappointed."Firstpost rated 2.75 out of 5 stars stating "Watchable only for Dhanush’s swag and energetic style."India Today rated 2 out of 5 stars stating "Director Durai Senthil Kumar’s Pattas starring Dhanush, Sneha and Mehreen Pirzada deals with a highly predictable story that is muddled with drama."The Indian Express rated 2.5 out of 5 stars stating "Pattas, starring Dhanush, Sneha and Mehreen Pirzada, has "style", but less substance."Deccan Chronicle rated 2.5 out of 5 stars stating "Based on a Pongal formula, the film relies heavily on the Dhanush brand."The News Minute rated 3.5 out of 5 stars stating "With his lithe body, Dhanush is every bit convincing as a martial arts practitioner, while Sneha gets a substantial role in which she excels."Zoom TV rated 2.5 out of 5 stars stating "Dhanush starrer Pattas hits the big screens on Pongal today. Sneha and Mehreen Pirzada play the female leads in this entertainer." Baradwaj Rangan of Film Companion South wrote "The biggest problem is the mechanical quality that distances us from everything on screen....It’s all about speed, speed, speed. Maybe there is a generational change underway, with younger viewers being increasingly impatient with older forms of storytelling. So yes, perhaps, the existing styles have to change. But at what cost? Surely we don’t want the movies reduced to mere video games!".

References

External links 

2020 action drama films
2020 martial arts films
Indian action drama films
Indian martial arts films
2020s Tamil-language films
2020 films